W.P. Wagner is an Edmonton Public high school located in Southeast Edmonton with a student population of about 1500. Its primary focus is science and technology. The school is named after William Phillip Wagner, a former Superintendent of Edmonton Public Schools.

Charity
The Wagner Leadership Class hosts a large charity event each year, which started in 2011 . Past events include the Bike-a-Thon and the Wagathon. The Wagathon is a charity event unique to Wagner where students sign up in teams of 8-12 and compete in a variety of activities throughout the evening. Activities in the past have included: Balloon Room, Wheel of Fate, Fingerpaint Pictionary, Peaceful Warrior, Mario Relay and many more. Everytime a team wins an event, they are awarded money toward a charity of their team's choice, which will be one of three provided by Wagner leadership.

Another annual event that is held is called the Wagner Market. The Market is a cross between a student run farmer's market and a carnival. Students are given the opportunity to sign up for booths to make a profit. Students booths may include: food items, selling items, selling arts or crafts, hosting a game, a car smash, obstacle courses, and lots more! The community is invited and it is a fun event for all - with 10% profit from each booth going toward a charity.

Wagner leadership does much more charity work. Services that have been done but are not limited to include volunteer work at various locations and charities around Edmonton, Helping Hampers, Terry Fox, Edmonton Food Bank and many more.

References

External links
 W.P. Wagner High School
 

Educational institutions established in 1969
High schools in Edmonton
1969 establishments in Alberta